Rockin' at the Hops is the fourth studio album by rock and roll pioneer Chuck Berry, released in July 1960 on Chess Records, catalogue LP 1448. With the exception of four tracks, "Down the Road a Piece," "Confessin' the Blues," "Betty Jean," and "Driftin' Blues," all selections had been previously released on 45 rpm singles.

Songs
The first 7" 45-RPM single from Rockin' at the Hops was "Childhood Sweetheart" backed with "Broken Arrow", released in September 1959. The second single was "Let It Rock" backed with "Too Pooped to Pop", released in January 1960; the A-side reached number 64 on the Billboard Hot 100, and the B-side reached number 42 on the Hot 100 and number 18 on the R&B Singles chart. The last two singles—"Bye Bye Johnny" backed with "Worried Life Blues" (released in May) and "I Got to Find My Baby" backed with "Mad Lad" (released in August)—did not chart.

Track listing

Personnel
 Chuck Berry – vocals, guitars
 Matt "Guitar" Murphy – electric guitar (tracks: A1 to A4, A6, B1, B5)
 Johnnie Johnson – piano  (tracks: A3 to A6, B2 to B5)
 Willie Dixon –  bass
 Fred Below – drums (tracks: A5, B1, B5)
 Eddie Hardy – drums (tracks: A1 to A4, A6, B1, B5)
 The Ecuadors – backing vocals
 L. C. Davis – tenor saxophone (tracks: A5, B1, B4, B5)

References

External links 

1960 albums
Chuck Berry albums
Albums produced by Phil Chess
Albums produced by Leonard Chess
Chess Records albums